The 2013–14 Lowland League was the first season of the Lowland Football League. The league championship was won by Spartans.  Despite being integrated into the pyramid system, it was agreed as part of league restructuring that the inaugural victor would not compete for a place in the SPFL.

Teams

The following teams moved to the Lowland League for the inaugural season.

To Lowland League
Transferred from East of Scotland League Premier Division
Edinburgh City
Gretna 2008
Preston Athletic
Spartans
Stirling University
Vale of Leithen
Whitehill Welfare

Transferred from East of Scotland League First Division
Gala Fairydean Rovers
Selkirk

Transferred from South of Scotland League
Dalbeattie Star
Threave Rovers

Transferred from Scottish Amateur Football League
East Kilbride

Stadia and Locations

League table

Results

References

Lowland Football League seasons
5